Víctor Estay (born 24 February 1951) is a Chilean footballer. He played in six matches for the Chile national football team in 1979. He was also part of Chile's squad for the 1979 Copa América tournament.

References

External links
 

1951 births
Living people
Chilean footballers
Chile international footballers
Association football forwards
Footballers from Santiago